Lina Woiwode (1886–1971) was an Austrian stage and film actress.

Selected filmography
Her Majesty the Barmaid (1931)
Once There Was a Waltz (1932)
The Magic Top Hat (1932)
The Cruel Mistress (1932)  
Suburban Cabaret (1935)
Mirror of Life (1938)
Anton the Last (1939)
 Viennese Girls (1945)

References

Bibliography
Youngkin, Stephen.  The Lost One: A Life of Peter Lorre. University Press of Kentucky, 2005.

External links
 

1886 births
1971 deaths
Austrian film actresses
Austrian stage actresses
20th-century Austrian actresses